USS APL-4 is an APL-2-class barracks ship of the United States Navy.

Construction and career
The ship was laid down on 31 May 1944, by the Puget Sound Navy Yard and launched on 3 August 1944. She was commissioned on 21 September 1945.

She was put into the reserve fleet by January 1947.

The ship undertook the CincPacFlt Berthing and Messing Program, in which she is berthed in San Diego since at least the early 2000s. She is being used as a berthing and messing barge.

References

 

 

Barracks ships of the United States Navy
Ships built in Bremerton, Washington
1944 ships